, sometimes referred to as , is a Japanese tokusatsu television series broadcast on TV Tokyo and its affiliates from October 7, 2005, to March 31, 2006, lasting 25 episodes (with one additional "Overview" special, summarizing the events of episodes 1 through 13, aired before episode 14). The series was created and directed by Keita Amemiya (Kamen Rider ZO, Zeiram) with supporting direction from Makoto Yokoyama (Power Rangers) and Kengo Kaji (Uzumaki). The creature designer was Yasushi Nirasawa, known for his later work as the designer of the Imagin for Kamen Rider Den-O, as well as for his work designing the monsters of Kamen Rider Blade and Kamen Rider Kabuto.

Since 2007, the show has also been aired in other countries such as Italy (on MTV), Malaysia (on 8TV), and Spain (on Canal Buzz). The show's HD remastered version was broadcast on TV Tokyo starting July 8, 2016. The television series is the first installment of the "GARO" metaseries, which is composed of several installments, including a live action television series, films, TV & film specials, and anime series. The television series has been licensed for a North American release by Kraken Releasing.

Plot

Garo focuses on the life of Kouga Saejima, who has assumed the title of Makai Knight to protect humanity against dark demonic manifestations called "Horrors". In his quest to destroy them, he encounters a young girl named Kaoru, whom he saves from a Horror, though he learns that she is stained with its demonic blood. As a rule, those that have been stained by the blood of a Horror must be killed, or else they will die painfully in approximately 100 days. Kouga spares Kaoru and tries to find a way to purify her before her remaining time expires. Thus, the series focuses on Kouga's developing relationship with Kaoru, and his responsibilities protecting humanity in accordance with the wishes of his father, the previous Garo. In the process, he encounters another Makai Knight named Rei Suzumura, who eventually becomes his ally. Later Kouga confronts his father's former disciple who is revealed to be the cause of a recent series of Horror attacks in preparation of a more sinister advent of the Horrors' originator, Messiah.

Horrors

The main antagonistic form in the series, Horrors are demons that reside in a realm known as the netherworld, and thrive on the darkness of humanity. The Horrors enter the human world through everyday objects known as Inga Gates, which are created through a mass of darkness. When the Horrors first come through, they also known as Inga Horrors, and must possess the body of the first human with inner darkness they come across. Because the Horrors feed on humans it is a Makai Knight's duty to hunt and slay the demons. Later entries in the series reveal more types of Horrors.

Episodes

Cast
: 
: 
: 
: 
: 
: 
: 
: 
: 
: 
: 
: 
Keiru (Voice): 
Beru (Voice): 
Rose (Voice):

Songs
Opening themes
 "Theme of GARO"
Music by TRYFORCE and JAM Project
 
Lyrics & Composition: Hironobu Kageyama
Arrangement: Kenichi Sudō
Artist: JAM Project
Ending themes
 
Lyrics & Composition: Masaki Kyomoto
Arrangement: Harukichi Yamamoto
Artist: Masaki Kyomoto (ep. 1–13) and Garo Project (ep. 22)
 
Lyrics & Composition: Masaki Kyomoto
Arrangement: Harukichi Yamamoto
Artist: Masaki Kyomoto (ep. 14–21) and Garo Project (ep. 23 & 24)

Sequels and spin-offs
In all the sequels and spinoffs in the Garo series, Hironobu Kageyama continues to reprise his role as the voice of Zaruba in each entry.

Video games

A video game based on the series was produced by Bandai for the PlayStation 2, under the name Golden Knight Garo. Two versions were released: a 'normal' version with the game disk, instructions, and standard pamphlets, and a more expensive 'Limited Edition' version which came with a green 'Fire' recolor of the metal Zaruba ring from the "Equip and Prop Vol. 1" Garo toy.

A mobile game titled  was released on May 27, 2016, commemorating the 10th anniversary of the Garo franchise. The game includes all characters from the live action series and the anime series.

Novels
 was released on March 31, 2007.

 was released on October 26, 2006. The novel's new edition including one new episode was released on October 30, 2010.

 was released on November 27, 2010.

Beast of the Demon Night

 is a two-part mini-series that premiered on Family Gekijo in December 2006.

Red Requiem

In July 2009, Tohokushinsha Film announced that a GARO feature film will be released in the fall of 2010.  was theatrically released in Japanese theaters on October 30, 2010. The story is a sequel to the original TV series, with Keita Amemiya reprising his role as head director. Ryosei Konishi and Hironobu Kageyama reprise their roles as Kouga/Garo and voice of Zaruba, with Makoto Yokoyama returning to choreograph the action sequences as well. Red Requiem uses 3D image technology developed by the Tohokushinsha group company Omnibus Japan for its visual effects.

Kiba

, released on September 7, 2011, is a spin-off V-Cinema featuring the story of Barago and Kiba the Dark Knight.

Makai Senki

 is a second season of the Garo television series that premiered in select Japanese theaters on September 24, 2011, before beginning broadcast on TV Tokyo on October 6, 2011.

Soukoku no Maryu

 was released in Japanese theaters on February 23, 2013, serving as an epilogue to Makai Senki, depicting Kouga Saejima's journey to the Promised Ground to retrieve Gajari's body. Ryosei Konishi was initially the only confirmed member of the cast, but Ray Fujita, Shouma Yamamoto, Ozuno Nakamura, Yukijirō Hotaru, Hironobu Kageyama, and Hiroyuki Watanabe were later confirmed to appear in the film. Guest stars include Yuki Kubota as Kakashi, Anna Aoi as Meru, Tetsuya Yanagihara as Esaruto, and Keiko Matsuzaka as Judam.

Yami o Terasu Mono

A third TV series titled  was broadcast on TV Tokyo from April 5 to September 20, 2013. The series is set in the near future, and features an entirely new story with a new Garo named Ryuga Dougai venturing into the Horror-plagued Vol City. The series also presents a brand new main cast that includes Wataru Kuriyama, Tsunenori Aoki, Junya Ikeda and fashion model Miki Nanri.

Tougen no Fue

In March 2013, the Garo team announced a new film titled , which was released in Japanese theaters on July 20 of that year. Set during the time of Soukoku no Maryu, Tougen no Fue follows Makai Priestesses Jabi and Rekka as they travel to the northern forests to protect the mystical and titular flute. Yasue Sato, Mary Matsuyama, Masahiro Kuranuki, and Kanji Tsuda reprise their roles from the franchise as Makai Priestess Jabi, Makai Priestess Rekka, Makai Priest Shiguto, and Makai Knight Kengi, respectively, also appearing in the film are Kumi Takiuchi and Miku Oono.

Zero: Black Blood

 is a spin-off six-episode miniseries starring Ray Fujita as his character Rei Suzumura from the original TV series. Rounding out the cast are Riria as Yuna, Naoki Takeshi as Kain, and Thane Camus as Ring. Keita Amemiya serves as executive director, with Ryu Kaneda directing and Yasuko Kobayashi writing. It was broadcast on Family Gekijo in March 2014 and shown in Japanese theaters in a limited release. JAM Project performed the opening theme "ZERO-BLACK BLOOD-" and Fujita's band Dustz performs the ending .

Makai no Hana

A fourth Garo television series titled  was broadcast on TV Tokyo from April 4 to September 26, 2014, and takes place between Makai Senki and Yami o Terasu Mono. With the exception of Yukijiro Hotaru reprising his portrayal of Gonza, it features a new cast consisting of Masei Nakayama as Raiga Saejima, the son of Kouga and Kaoru who inherited his father's title as the Golden Knight Garo, Atomu Mizuishi as Crow the Phantom Knight, and Natsumi Ishibashi as Mayuri, a mysterious tool with mystical powers that takes the form of a young woman.

Anime series

It is produced by Studio MAPPA and directed by Yuichiro Hayashi. Taking place in the fictional country of Valiante in the Middle Ages, head writer Yasuko Kobayashi explained that, with the exception of Zaruba, it is unrelated to any characters or stories in the rest of the Garo continuity, though still exists as part of the larger universe's timeline. The series has been licensed by Funimation as Garo: The Animation, making it the first Garo installment to see a North American release.

A second series titled , taking place in Japan's Heian period, was announced for a 2015 release, alongside a film sequel of the first series titled Garo: Divine Flame, to coincide with the Garo tenth anniversary.

A film sequel of the first series titled  was released in Japanese theaters on May 21, 2016.

A third series titled  was broadcast on TV Tokyo from October 6, 2017, to March 30, 2018.

A film sequel of the second series titled  premiered in Japanese theaters on October 6, 2018.

Gold Storm Sho

 is both a film and a television series that serve as sequels to Yami o Terasu Mono. Wataru Kuriyama and Miki Nanri reprise their roles and are joined by new cast members, among them Masahiro Inoue as the series antagonist Jinga. The film adaptation was released in Japanese theatres on March 28, 2015, while the television series was broadcast on TV Tokyo from April 3 to September 18, 2015.

Bikuu
 is a film starring Sayaka Akimoto reprising her role as Bikuu from Makai no Hana. It was released in Japanese theaters on November 14, 2015. Akimoto performs the ending theme .

Makai Retsuden

 is an omnibus television series which features the cast of the previous live action series. It celebrates the 10th anniversary of the Garo franchise and was broadcast on TV Tokyo from April 8 to June 24, 2016.

Ashura
 is a special episode, with the Garo production team collaborating with New Japan Pro-Wrestling to commemorate the 10th anniversary of the Garo franchise. It features Hiroshi Tanahashi as Gouki and Togi Makabe and was broadcast on TV Tokyo on July 1, 2016. Taking place between Makai Senki and Makai no Hana, Kaoru tells a young Raiga the story of one of the first Makai Knights to bear the Garo title: Gouki.

Zero: Dragon Blood

A brand new television series about Ray Fujita's character Rei Suzumura was originally announced as one of many new projects the Garo Project team were working on in 2015 and it was originally just known as Zero. In June 2016, it was announced that the series would be titled  to be broadcast in 2017. It was broadcast on TV Tokyo from January 6 to March 31, 2017.

Live stage shows
 features Masahiro Inoue's character Jinga and is connected to Garo: Kami no Kiba. It was held between November 29 to December 3, 2017, at Space Zero in Yoyogi.

 features Masahiro Inoue's character Jinga and is connected to Kami no Kiba: Jinga. It was held between January 5 to January 14, 2019, at The Galaxy Theatre in Higashishinagawa.

Kami no Kiba

 is a film of the series featuring Wataru Kuriyama's character Ryuga Dougai, along the main cast of Yami o Terasu Mono and Gold Storm Sho. It was released in Japanese theaters on January 6, 2018.

Kami no Kiba: Jinga

In November 2017, series creator Keita Amemiya announced plans for a spin-off television series, titled , featuring Masahiro Inoue's character Jinga was in the works. In July 2018, it was announced that the series is scheduled to be broadcast in October of that year. It was broadcast on Tokyo MX from October 4 to December 27, 2018.

Gekkou no Tabibito
 is film that stars Masei Nakayama as Raiga Saejima serving as a sequel to the Makai no Hana television series, also including Hiroki Konishi who reprise his role as the original protagonist Kouga Saejima. After the production announcement in November 2014, it was announced in November 2018 that the film is scheduled to be released in theaters in 2019. It was released in Japanese theaters on October 4, 2019.

A three part mini series, P Garo Saejima Kouga was streamed on YouTube prior to the release of the film.

Versus Road
Garo: Versus Road is a television series, which celebrates the 15th anniversary of the Garo franchise that premiered on Tokyo MX on April 2, 2020. It features a brand new cast that includes Koya Matsudai, Yuhi, Tokito, Toman, Naoya Shimizu, and Shutaro Kadoshita. This series is set in a different continuity from those of previous entries in the franchise.

References

External links
GARO at TV Tokyo 
GARO PROJECT 

 
2005 Japanese television series debuts
2006 Japanese television series endings
Tokusatsu television series
Japanese horror fiction television series
Martial arts television series
TV Tokyo original programming